Shwe Sitthin (also known as Myin Phyu Shin) is one of the 37 Burmese nat spirits. He was a son of King Saw Mon Nit, the last "king" of the Pagan dynasty. His mother was Medaw Shwezaga, also one of the 37 nats. 

He is said to have died after his father had imprisoned him for neglecting his duties and playing while going to war. In iconography, he is usually portrayed in a seated pose, wearing a chadah-style golden crown and holding a sword by its hilt, upright in his hand.

References

19